These are the results of the women's vault competition, one of six events for female competitors in artistic gymnastics at the 2000 Summer Olympics in Sydney. The qualification and final rounds took place on September 17 and 24 at the Sydney SuperDome.

Results

Qualification

Eighty-three gymnasts competed in the vault event during the qualification round on September 17.  The eight highest scoring gymnasts advanced to the final on September 24.  Each country was limited to two competitors in the final.

Final

Note:  was disqualified on April 28, 2010, due to the discovery that she was underaged when she competed. She averaged a 9.487 on her two vaults in the event final and would have placed seventh.

References
Official Olympic Report
Gymnasticsresults.com

Women's vault
2000
2000 in women's gymnastics
Women's events at the 2000 Summer Olympics